Anthony DeLuca may refer to:

 Anthony J. DeLuca, American politician, Delaware state senator
 Anthony DeLuca (Illinois politician) (born 1970), Illinois state representative
 Anthony DeLuca (musician), American musician and drummer for Blake Babies, Swirlies, Unsane, Negative Approach
 Tony DeLuca (politician) (Anthony M. DeLuca Sr., 1937–2022), Pennsylvania state representative
 Tony DeLuca (American football) (Anthony Lawrence DeLuca, 1960–1999), American football player